Daniel Poleshchuk (born 11 February 1996) is an Israeli professional squash player who represents Israel. He reached a career-high world ranking of World No. 97 in January 2023.

Early and personal life
Poleshchuk was born in and now lives in Ramat Gan, Israel.  He is Jewish.  At the age of 13, he moved to England, to study on scholarship in Millfield School where he was coached by Jonah Barrington and Ian Thomas for five years.

Squash career
Poleshchuk won a gold medal in Men's Open Squash at the 2013 Maccabiah Games, 2017 Maccabiah Games, and the 2022 Maccabiah Games. Also, he is a six-time Israeli Men's National Champion. 

In February 2015 at the age of 19, Poleshchuk won his first Professional Squash Association (PSA) title, which made him the first Israeli squash player in the history to achieve that. Later on that year, he won his second PSA title in London, England.

References

External links 

1996 births
Living people
Israeli male squash players
English male squash players
Sportspeople from Ramat Gan
People educated at Millfield
Maccabiah Games gold medalists for Israel
Maccabiah Games medalists in squash
Competitors at the 2013 Maccabiah Games
Competitors at the 2017 Maccabiah Games
Jewish Israeli sportspeople
Jewish British sportspeople
21st-century Israeli people